The Ketchikan Gateway Borough School District provides k-12 public education to the children of the Ketchikan Gateway Borough and Ketchikan, Alaska. The district is governed by a school board of seven community-elected members, with one advisory student member present during the school year, elected by the students of Ketchikan High School.

Schools

High schools
Ketchikan High School
Revilla Junior/Senior High school

Middle school
Schoenbar Middle School

Elementary schools
Houghtaling Elementary School
Fawn Mountain Elementary School
Point Higgins Elementary School
Ketchikan Charter School
Tongass School of Arts & Sciences

World War II

The Territory of Alaska presented Alaska's Liberty brick to the Ketchikan Schools on Pearl Harbor Day, 1943 for having the best Schools at War performance in the territory in the previous school year.  Each of Ketchikan's schools also received a Minute Man Flag. The brick, displayed in a glass case, was to be permanently belong to the Ketchikan Schools. As of 2021, it is in the collection of the Tongass Historical Museum in Ketchikan.

See also 
List of school districts in Alaska

References

External links
Official site

School districts in Alaska
Education in Ketchikan Gateway Borough, Alaska